Johann Jakob Christian Donner (Krefeld, 10 October 1799 – Stuttgart, 28 March 1875) was a German classical philologist and translator.

He studied theology and philology at the University of Tübingen. Beginning in 1823, he was associated with the Protestant seminary in Urach. In 1827 he was named professor at the upper gymnasium in Ellwangen, and from 1843 to 1852, was a professor at the upper gymnasium in Stuttgart.

His main work was a translation of the plays by Sophocles, which he published in between 1838 and 1839 (8th edition, 1875). This translation formed the basis for Felix Mendelssohn's incidental music Antigone (1841). Donner was also responsible for providing translations of works by Euripides, Aeschylus, Pindar, Aristophanes, Terence, Plautus, and Homer (Iliad and Odyssey).

Bibliography

External links

 

People from Krefeld
1799 births
1875 deaths
German classical philologists
University of Tübingen alumni
Translators from Greek
Latin–German translators
19th-century German translators
19th-century German writers
19th-century German male writers
Translators of Ancient Greek texts
German male non-fiction writers
Translators of Homer